The Pentium II is a sixth-generation CPU from Intel targeted at the consumer market.

Desktop processors

"Klamath" (350 nm) 

 All models support: MMX
 L2 cache is off-die and runs at 50% CPU speed
 Part numbers prefixed with a B are for boxed retail CPUs

"Deschutes" (250 nm) 

 All models support: MMX
 L2 cache is off-die and runs at 50% CPU speed
 The Pentium II OverDrive is a Deschutes Pentium II core packaged for Socket 8 operation.  It comes with 512 KB of off-die full-speed L2 cache, which makes it very similar to the Pentium II Xeon.

Mobile processors

"Tonga" (250 nm) 

 All models support: MMX
 L2 cache is off-die and runs at 50% CPU speed

"Dixon" (250 or 180 nm) 

 All models support: MMX
 L2 cache is on-die and runs at 100% CPU speed
 Also known as Pentium II "Performance Enhanced"
 mqbA1 stepping is actually at 180 nm 27.4 million transistors die size 180 mm2

See also 
 List of Intel Pentium processors
 List of Intel Pentium Pro processors
 List of Intel Pentium III processors
 List of Intel processors
 List of microprocessors

References

External links
Intel Automated Relational Knowledgebase
Intel Microprocessor Quick Reference Guide - Product Family Pentium II

Pentium 2
Intel Pentium 2